Elizabeth "Spencer" Wetmore is an American politician from the state of South Carolina. She is a member of the South Carolina House of Representatives from the 115th district.

Wetmore is from Charleston, South Carolina. She graduated from Academic Magnet High School in North Charleston, South Carolina, Princeton University, and Vanderbilt University Law School. After being sworn into the South Carolina Bar in 2010, Wetmore served as a Prosecutor for the Ninth Circuit Solicitor‘s Office in Charleston County. In 2015, she was appointed city manager for Folly Beach, South Carolina. 

When Peter McCoy resigned from the 115th district seat in the South Carolina House to serve as a U.S. Attorney in 2020, Wetmore ran in the special election to succeed him and won the election on August 11, 2020. She serves on the House Judiciary Committee and the Regulations and Administrative Procedures Committee.

Wetmore and her husband, Burns, have lived in Folly Beach since 2012. They have two daughters.

References

External links

1983 births
21st-century American politicians
American city managers
Living people
People from Charleston County, South Carolina
Princeton University alumni
South Carolina Democrats
Vanderbilt University Law School alumni

Women state legislators in South Carolina